Böda Church is a Lutheran church in Böda socken on the Swedish island Öland, in the Baltic Sea. It belongs to the Diocese of Växjö.

History and architecture
Böda Church was built during the second half of the 12th century as a Romanesque church with nave, a narrower choir and apse. During the late 12th and early 13th century, the church was rebuilt into a fortified church. During the reconstruction, the apse was removed and the nave and choir made equally broad.

The church was almost completely rebuilt 1801-03. The new church incorporates a few medieval elements, notably the Romanesque north portal. The church furnishings are post-Reformation works of art.

References

External links

Churches in the Diocese of Växjö
Churches in Kalmar County